Overcoats is singer-songwriter John Hiatt's second album, released in 1975. It is his second and last album for Epic Records.

Track listing
All tracks written and arranged by John Hiatt

 "One More Time" – 3:40
 "Smiling in the Rain" – 4:19
 "I'm Tired of Your Stuff" – 3:36
 "Distance" – 3:34
 "Down Home" – 3:11
 "Overcoats" – 6:50
 "I Want Your Love Inside of Me" – 3:12
 "I Killed an Ant With My Guitar" – 3:26
 "Motorboat to Heaven" – 5:27
 "The Lady of the Night" – 3:10

Personnel
John Hiatt – acoustic guitar, electric guitar, twelve-string guitar, percussion, piano, vocals
 Ted Reynolds – bass guitar
 Larrie Londin – drums
 Shane Keister – piano, electric piano, Moog synthesizer, Fender Rhodes
with:
 John Huey – steel guitar on "Motorboat to Heaven" and "The Lady of the Night"
 Josh Graves – dobro on "Motorboat to Heaven" and "The Lady of the Night"
 Bobby Emmons – organ on "I'm Tired of Your Stuff"
 Gene Estes – marimba on "I Killed an Ant With My Guitar"
 Tracy Nelson, Anita Baugh, Dianne Davidson, Sadie – backing vocals on "Motorboat to Heaven"
 Samuel Boghossian – viola on "Distance"
 Allan Harshman – viola on "Distance"
 Jesse Ehrlich – cello on "Distance"
 Billy Puett – clarinet, flute, recorder, soprano saxophone, tenor saxophone
 Norman Ray – baritone saxophone
 Irving Kane – trombone
 George Tidwell – trumpet, horn arrangements

References

1975 albums
John Hiatt albums
Epic Records albums